Tung Chung East is a proposed MTR station on the  to be constructed to the east of Tung Chung, Lantau Island, New Territories, Hong Kong.

It was proposed in the Tung Chung New Town Extension Study, to serve a proposed new  of reclaimed land, along with a new Tung Chung West station.

References

 Tung Chung
 Proposed railway stations in Hong Kong
 MTR stations in the New Territories